Cara Black was the defending champion, but turned 18 years old during the season and, therefore, was ineligible to compete in Juniors.

Katarina Srebotnik defeated Kim Clijsters in the final, 7–6(7–3), 6–3 to win the girls' singles tennis title at the 1998 Wimbledon Championships. It was her 1st and only Grand Slam title in Juniors.

Seeds

  Evie Dominikovic (quarterfinals)
  Jelena Dokic (semifinals)
  Alexandra Stevenson (third round)
  Tina Pisnik (quarterfinals)
  Petra Rampre (second round)
  Wynne Prakusya (quarterfinals)
  Katarina Srebotnik (champion)
  Jelena Kostanić (first round)
  Erica Krauth (third round)
  Tina Hergold (semifinals)
  Milagros Sequera (quarterfinals)
  Gabriela Voleková (first round)
  Kildine Chevalier (first round)
  Zsófia Gubacsi (third round)
  Daniela Hantuchová (second round)
  Aurélie Védy (first round)

Draw

Finals

Top half

Section 1

Section 2

Bottom half

Section 3

Section 4

References

External links

Girls' Singles
Wimbledon Championship by year – Girls' singles